Arkía El-Ammari (born ) was a Spanish female volleyball player, playing as an opposite. She was part of the Spain women's national volleyball team.

She competed at the 2009 Women's European Volleyball Championship. On club level she played for Club Voleibol Tenerife in 2009.

References

External links
http://blogs.larioja.com/voleibolenlarioja/tag/arkia-el-ammari/
http://www.talaveravoleibol.com/nos-visita-la-jugadora-profesional-arkia-el-ammari/

1976 births
Living people
Spanish women's volleyball players
Spanish sportspeople of Moroccan descent
Place of birth missing (living people)